Kearsley is a surname of English origin with a variety of spellings apparently locational in origin, the towns of Kearsley formerly in the county of Lancashire, now in Greater Manchester and also the town of Keresley in the county of Warwickshire  have been speculated as being possible origins of the surname.

Notable people with the surname Kearsley
Bryan Kearsley, British philatelist
Harvey Kearsley (1880–1956), British Army officer and courtier
Jonathan Kearsley (1786–1859), American military officer and politician
Susanna Kearsley, Canadian writer
William Kearsley (1863–1921), Australian politician

See also
Kearsley (disambiguation)

References 

Surnames of English origin